Polygons are used in computer graphics to compose images that are three-dimensional in appearance.

Usually (but not always) triangular, polygons arise when an object's surface is modeled, vertices are selected, and the object is rendered in a wire frame model.  This is quicker to display than a shaded model; thus the polygons are a stage in computer animation.  The polygon count refers to the number of polygons being rendered per frame.

Beginning with the fifth generation of video game consoles, the use of polygons became more common, and with each succeeding generation, polygonal models became increasingly complex.

Competing methods for rendering polygons that avoid seams
 Point
Floating Point
Fixed-Point
Polygon
because of rounding, every scanline has its own direction in space and may show its front or back side to the viewer.
Fraction (mathematics)
Bresenham's line algorithm
Polygons have to be split into triangles
The whole triangle shows the same side to the viewer
The point numbers from the Transform and lighting stage have to converted to Fraction (mathematics)
Barycentric coordinates (mathematics)
Used in raytracing

See also
 Low poly
 Polygon, for general polygon information
 Polygon mesh, for polygon object representation
 Polygon modeling

References 

3D computer graphics